Ivar is a Scandinavian given name.

Ivar may also refer to:

Ivar (1980 film), a 1980 Malayalam film
Ivar (2003 film), a 2003 Malayalam film
Ivar (brand), a brand of backpacks
Ivar (wrestler) (born 1984), American professional wrestler
Ivar, Kuhsorkh, a village in Iran
Ivar's, an American restaurant
Ivars, a Latvian given name
Instance variable (iVar), especially in the Objective-C programming language
Ímar, a 9th-century Norse king

See also